The following lists events that happened in 1923 in El Salvador.

Incumbents
President: Jorge Meléndez (until 1 March), Alfonso Quiñónez Molina (starting 1 March)
Vice President: Alfonso Quiñónez Molina (until 1 March), Pío Romero Bosque (starting 1 March)

Events

January
 14 January – Voters in El Salvador elected National Democratic Party candidate Alfonso Quiñónez Molina to be President of El Salvador with a 100% margin but no results were posted. He was the only candidate.

February
 7 February – El Salvador signed the 1923 Central American Treaty of Peace and Amity.

March
 1 March – Alfonso Quiñónez Molina was sworn in as President of El Salvador. Pío Romero Bosque was sworn in as vice president.

September
 17 September – C.D. Luis Ángel Firpo, a Salvadoran soccer team, was established.

Deaths
 3 September – Pedro José Escalón, politician (b. 1847)

References

 
El Salvador
1920s in El Salvador
Years of the 20th century in El Salvador
El Salvador